The 2019 Nigerian Senate election in Jigawa State was held on February 23, 2019, to elect members of the Nigerian Senate to represent Jigawa State. Sabo Mohammed representing Jigawa South-West and Danladi Abdullahi Sankara representing Jigawa North-West, and Ibrahim Hadejia representing Jigawa North-East all won on the platform of All Progressives Congress.

Overview

Summary

Results

Jigawa South West 
A total of 11 candidates registered with the Independent National Electoral Commission to contest in the election. APC candidate Sabo Mohammed won the election, defeating PDP Mustapha Sule Lamido and 9 other party candidates. Mohammed scored 224,543 votes, while  APC candidate scored 143,611 votes.

Jigawa North West
A total of 12 candidates registered with the Independent National Electoral Commission to contest in the election. APC candidate Danladi Abdullahi Sankara won the election, defeating PDP candidate Nasiru Umar Roni and 10 other party candidates. Sankara pulled 286,655 votes, while PDP candidate Roni scored 120,314 and African Democratic Congress (ADC) candidate Mustafa Madawaki scored 36,030.

Jigawa North East 
A total of 9 candidates registered with the Independent National Electoral Commission to contest in the election. APC candidate Ibrahim Hassan Hadejia won the election, defeating PDP candidate Ubale Shitu. Hadejia pulled 184,185 votes while his closest rival Ubale Shitu pulled 103,039 votes.

References 

Jigawa State senatorial elections
Jigawa State Senate elections